The 1992 IIHF Women's World Championships was held April 20–26, 1992, in Tampere in Finland. The Team Canada won their second gold medal at the World Championships, defeating the United States.

Qualification
The tournament was held between eight teams. Canada and the United States received automatic qualification to the tournament. In addition, the top five teams from the 1991 European Championship would be joined by the winner of the 1992 Asian Qualification Tournament.

 – Automatically Qualified
 - Winner - 1992 Asian Qualification Tournament
 – 3rd Place – 1991 European Championship
 – Winner – 1991 European Championship
 – 4th place – 1991 European Championship
 – 5th place – 1991 European Championship
 – 2nd Place – 1991 European Championship
 – Automatically Qualified

Asian Qualification Tournament (China)

Final tournament
The eight participating teams were divided up into two seeded groups as below. The teams played each other once in a single round robin format. The top two teams from the group proceeded to the Final Round, while the remaining teams played in the consolation round.

First round

Group A

Standings

Results
All times local (UTC+4)

Group B

Standings

Results
All times local (UTC+4)

Playoff round

Consolation round 5–8 Place

Consolation round 7–8 Place

Consolation round 5–6 Place

Final round

Semifinals

Match for third place

Final

Champions

Scoring leaders

Goaltending leaders
Only the top five goaltenders, based on save percentage, who have played 40% of their team's minutes are included in this list.

TOI = Time on ice (minutes:seconds); SA = Shots against; GA = Goals against; GAA = Goals against average; Sv% = Save percentage; SO = Shutouts
Source: IIHF.com

Final standings

Directorate Awards
 Goaltender:  Annica Ahlen
 Defenceman:  Geraldine Heaney
 Forward:  Cammi Granato

References

External links
 Summary from the Women's Hockey Net
 Detailed summary from passionhockey.com

IIHF Women's World Ice Hockey Championships
World
World
1992
April 1992 sports events in Europe
Sports competitions in Tampere
Women's ice hockey competitions in Finland
1992 in Finnish women's sport